Eberti Marques de Toledo (born March 1, 1986) is a Brazilian football player.

Club statistics

References

External links

1986 births
Living people
Brazilian footballers
J1 League players
Yokohama FC players
Brazilian expatriate footballers
Expatriate footballers in Japan
Association football forwards